Purley Albert Baker (18581924) was an ordained Methodist minister who strongly opposed any consumption of alcoholic beverages and was superintendent of the Ohio Anti-Saloon League.

Biography
Purley Baker was born in Liberty Township, Jackson County, Ohio on April 10, 1858. His father died when he was ten years old, and he began working on farms to support himself. At age 17, he attended a revival meeting in Williamsport and converted to Methodism. He attended school in Xenia, read law with a judge in Circleville, and entered the ministry at age 25.

He married Lillie I. Greene at Washington Court House, Ohio on August 27, 1884.

He became head of the national Anti-Saloon League in 1903, and five years later created the League's Industrial Relations Department to promote the idea that imposing prohibition would be a good business investment. He raised large sums of money to create a major information campaign, an important component of which was to demonize the producers of alcoholic beverages.

He announced his resignation as general superintendent of the League on March 8, 1924 for reasons of ill health. He died at his home in Westerville, Ohio on March 30.

See also
Temperance Row Historic District

References

External links
 Purley Baker at the Westerville Public Library

1858 births
1924 deaths
American temperance activists
Anti-German sentiment in the United States
Methodist ministers
People from Jackson County, Ohio